Fear and Whiskey is the fourth studio album by English rock band The Mekons. It was released in 1985 and marked a dramatic shift in their sound following a short hiatus. It has been credited as being one of the first alternative country albums, as it blends the band's previously-established punk rock style with a country music sound. Due to the limited production and distribution capabilities of parent label Sin Records, the initial album release was met with only modest commercial success but with broad critical praise. It remained largely unavailable until it was re-released in 2002 by Quarterstick Records, a subsidiary of Touch and Go Records.

The musical style represents a sharp break with the group's previous work, as fiddle, steel guitar, and harmonica are included, but the instrumentation of punk music is also present, particularly on the energetic "Hard to be Human Again". Tom Greenhalgh, one of the primary creative forces in the Mekons, commented that as he listened to a great deal of country music in the early 1980s "pretty soon the difference between the three chords of country and the three chords of punk became blurred." The album closes with a cover of Leon Payne's "Lost Highway".

The album's lyrics describe a dark scenario of a community struggling to retain its capacity for joy and humanity through a devastating war. Rock critic Robert Christgau described it as "a sort of concept album sort of about life during wartime".

Track listing

Personnel 

 Jacqui Callis - vocals
 Lu Edmonds - bass
 John Gill - engineer, historical research, mixing
 Steve Goulding - drums
 Tom Greene - guitar, piano, vocals
 Tom Greenhalgh - mixing, vocals
 Suzie Honeyman - fiddle
 John Ingledew - photography
 Jon Langford - guitar, harp, vocals
 Ken Lite - bass, rhythm guitar, vocals
 The Mekons - composer, primary artist, producer
 Terry Nelson - walkie talkie
 Shelagh Quinn - engineer
 Dick Taylor - guitar
 Robert Sigmund Worby - drums

References

External links 

Fear and Whiskey (Adobe Flash) at Radio3Net (streamed copy where licensed)
 
Fear and Whiskey (Bandcamp album/stream)

The Mekons albums
1985 albums